École secondaire Louis-Joseph Papineau may refer to:
École secondaire Louis-Joseph-Papineau (Montreal, Quebec)
École secondaire Louis-Joseph Papineau (Papineauville, Quebec)